Moore Glacier is a glacier in northern Greenland. Administratively it belongs to the Northeast Greenland National Park. Between 2006 and 2010 there was an automatic weather station in the glacier.

The glacier was named by Robert Peary after Mr. Charles Moore, who convinced US President William McKinley to keep supporting Peary's Polar ventures in the face of the United States Department of the Navy opposing further explorations.

Geography 
The Moore Glacier is the largest of the valley glaciers located in the area of the easternmost subranges of the Roosevelt Range. It flows roughly in a northwestern direction from the southeast and stretches between the H. H. Benedict Range to the southwest and the Bertelsen Glacier to the northeast.

The Moore Glacier has its terminus at the head of the southeastern shore of Bliss Bay, which is permanently clogged with ice.

See also
List of glaciers in Greenland
Peary Land

References

External links
Ice-marginal processes, sediments and landforms at Moore Glacier, northernmost Greenland
Manliness and Exploration: The Discovery of the North Pole
Glaciers of Greenland
Roosevelt Range